Fleet Readiness Center East (FRCE) opened its doors Dec. 16, 1943 as the Assembly and Repair Department at Marine Corps Air Station Cherry Point, North Carolina.  The name has changed over the years, but its focus remains the same -- to give our nation's warfighters the highest quality airframes, engines, components and services on time and at the best value.  FRCE is a Naval Aviation maintenance and repair depot under Naval Air Systems Command, headquartered in Patuxent River, Maryland. It is also the Department of Defense Vertical Lift Center of Excellence.

FRCE is North Carolina's largest maintenance, repair and overhaul and technical services provider with more than 4,000 military, civilian and contract workers. Many of the employees are members of the International Association of Machinist and Aerospace Workers, American Federation of Government Employees, and National Association of Aeronautical Examiners unions.

FRCE's primary facility is centrally located on the eastern seaboard at Marine Corps Air Station (MCAS) Cherry Point, accessible by air, rail, highway, waterway, and deep-water port facilities. The command also has detachments at MCAS New River, North Carolina and Beaufort, South Carolina; Hurlburt Field, Florida; and at the Global TransPark in Kinston, North Carolina.

History
In the late summer 1941, plans were being developed to build an Assembly and Repair (A&R) Department at Marine Corps Air Station Cherry Point to perform aircraft maintenance for the air station and other nearby airfields.  However, those plans were disrupted by the attack on Pearl Harbor in December.  The immediate declaration of war on Japan prompted A&R’s blueprints to be withdrawn, and its construction remained questionable until a set of modified plans were issued in early 1942.  Once the construction work began, it moved at an impressive pace, considering the massive foundation required.  Project 85 (now known as Building 137) was formally accepted by the Navy on Dec. 16, 1943, the date the facility observes its anniversary. The facility covered more than 500,000 square feet when it opened and employed 36 people, three of whom were military.

A&R personnel provided maintenance on several World War II combat aircraft, including the Mitchell B-25 and Marauder B-26 bombers and Corsair fighters. By 1945, the department reached 3,778 personnel, two-thirds of whom were military. It was at this time that the facility’s name was changed to Overhaul and Repair (O&R) Department.

The O&R Department continued to grow throughout the 1950s. Expanded hangar space, shop space and clean rooms were added to meet the increasing demands of aviation logistics support. These, as well as many other facility enhancements, were instrumental in making the O&R one of the most advanced aviation rework industrial complexes in the country.  Some of the aircraft repaired were the FH-1 Phantom I, SNB Expediter, F-3H Demon and FJ Fury.

In the mid-1960s, the O&R had become vital in supporting fleet operations worldwide by specializing in Naval and Marine Corps rework.  On April 1, 1969, two major reorganizational developments occurred: The facility was re-designated Naval Air Rework Facility (NARF) and the depot was detached from MCAS Cherry Point and became a separate tenant command under Navy management.  The facility was ranked as the second largest industrial plant in the state comprising 46 buildings, more than 91 acres of land and a total replacement value of more than $36 million.  In the coming years, NARF expanded and obtained new aviation workloads. These included the F-4 Phantom II, F-11 Tiger, CH-46 Sea Knight helicopter, OV-10 Bronco and O-1 Bird Dog.

Significant upgrades and modernization for NARF highlighted the 1970s, along with recognition of the workforce’s production performance.  In 1972, NARF was rated the best depot on the East Coast by a customer satisfaction index. It also was awarded the Rework Excellence Program Award, representing the highest degree of customer satisfaction, while maintaining work schedules and working within acceptable cost limits. Productivity continued to improve via the depot’s facility and equipment modernization program.  In 1973, the AV-8A Harrier and Pegasus F402 engine programs were assigned to NARF.  The depot sent two field teams to Antarctica to repair two damaged LC-130 Hercules aircraft for the National Science Foundation in 1975 and 1976.  The first CH-46E Sea Knight helicopter to complete conversion was rolled out.

More enhancements to improve production were implemented at NARF in the 1980s. The new Automated Storage, Kitting and Retrieval System (ASKARS) brought the warehouse to the workers. The depot now tracked the location and movements of components inside and outside through the new automated warehouse system.  Two additions were added to NARF, respectively, in 1985 and 1986 — the Production Support and the AV-8 Power Check facilities. In March 1987, NARF was renamed Naval Aviation Depot.

Between 1990 and 1991, during Operation Desert Shield/Storm, several field teams were sent overseas to repair and overhaul engines, components and aircraft. The last OV-10 Bronco aircraft was repaired in May 1992.  Numerous construction projects were begun and completed during the 1990s.  These include a Vertical/Short Takeoff and Landing Facility, a Naval Engine Airfoil Center and an Engine Test building for the AV-8B Harrier.  In March 1993, a Base Realignment and Closure (BRAC) list was announced. On June 11, following a one-day visit by a BRAC commissioner, 1,600 NADEP employees traveled to Norfolk, Virginia, to show their support for the depot and attend a hearing of the full commission. Four months later, it was announced that NADEP was not on the closure list.  The depot also inducted its first CH-53E Super Stallion helicopter to undergo Standard Depot Level Maintenance.  In 1999, Cherry Point was recognized as the Navy’s sole, depot-level repair site for helicopter blades.

The turn of the century marked a new chapter in depot history. NADEP began its Manufacturing Resource Planning II Program with the first work order on a T-62T Auxiliary Power Unit. The last F-4 took off from NADEP on Jan. 29, 2003.  The organization was redesignated as Naval Air (NAVAIR) Depot in March 2004. In 2006, NAVAIR Depot was redesignated Fleet Readiness Center East.

Today, FRCE is a modern industrial complex that has considerable impact on the economy of North Carolina and the communities surrounding the air station.  The workload continues to grow with F-35 Lightning II modifications and component capability, V-22 Osprey airframe modifications, UH-1Y Venom and AH-1Z Viper airframe workload, additive manufacturing projects and other initiatives.

The depot is the Department of Defense Vertical Lift Center of Excellence (VLCOE) and continues to provide maintenance, engineering and logistics support on a variety of aircraft, engines and components for all branches of the U.S. armed forces.

Responsibility
Fleet Readiness Center East has earned a reputation of excellence in providing world-class maintenance, engineering and logistics support for Navy and Marine Corps aviation, as well as other armed services, federal agencies and foreign governments. Our skilled workforce uses state-of-the-art technology to ensure that FRCE is without equal in providing quality, cost-effective support. Our employees take great pride in their work, and this professional spirit is evident in the high quality products they produce.
Our mission is to maintain and operate facilities for and perform a complete range of depot level rework operations on designated weapon systems, accessories, and equipment; manufacture parts and assemblies as required; provide engineering services in the development of changes of hardware design; furnish technical services on aircraft maintenance and logistic problems; and perform, upon specific request or assignment, other levels of aircraft maintenance.

See also
Fleet Readiness Center Mid-Atlantic
Fleet Readiness Center Northwest
Fleet Readiness Center Southeast
Fleet Readiness Center Southwest
Fleet Readiness Center West
Fleet Readiness Center Western Pacific

References

Wikipedia articles incorporating text from the United States Navy
1943 establishments in North Carolina
United States naval aviation
Fleet Readiness Centers
Buildings and structures in Craven County, North Carolina